Katherine Lang  may refer to:

Katherine Kelly Lang, actress
Kathryn Dawn Lang, (stage name: k.d. lang), singer/songwriter and actress
Kathryn Layng, actress

See also
Kate Lang Johnson
Kathryn Leng, cricketer
Lang (surname)